Mistake is the third studio album by American indie rock band D+, released in 2002.

Track listing 
 "Mistake" – 4:40
 "The Business" – 3:44
 "God Beyond God" – 5:53
 "Are You Done" – 0:53
 "Megadose" – 2:37
 "What's Not To Fall In Love With" – 4:42
 "You're So Right" – 3:27
 "Take You For Granted" – 3:53

Personnel 
Bret Lunsford
Karl Blau – bass, vocals
Phil Elvrum
D+ – Recording
Liz Guy/Sprout – viola
Dave Matthies – additional recording

References 

1998 albums
D+ (band) albums